

This is a list of the Sites of Special Scientific Interest (SSSIs) in County Durham, England. It excludes SSSIs situated in that area south of the River Tyne that is now part of the metropolitan county of Tyne and Wear as well as the area north of the River Tees which, prior to 1996, formed part of the county of Cleveland. 

As of July 2010, County Durham has 88 sites that have been designated as SSSIs, of which 67 have been designated for their biological interest, 16 for their geological interest, and 5 for both.

Five of these sites are shared with an adjacent county:
 Moorhouse and Cross Fell with Cumbria;
 Derwent Gorge and Horsleyhope Ravine, Hexhamshire Moors and Muggleswick, Stanhope and Edmundbyers Commons and Blanchland Moor with Northumberland;
 Durham Coast with both Cleveland (in the south) and Tyne and Wear (in the north).

Designation of SSSIs

Sites of Special Scientific Interest are areas that have been selected for special protection because of their floral, faunal or geological significance. The concept was first given a statutory basis in the National Parks and Access to the Countryside Act 1949, the relevant provisions of which were repeated in the Wildlife and Countryside Act 1981. Under the 1949 Act, responsibility for selecting and notifying SSSIs in England was delegated to the newly created Nature Conservancy, which was replaced in 1973 by the Nature Conservancy Council (NCC). In 1991, the NCC was split up, its responsibilities in England being passed to English Nature which, in turn, was amalgamated into a new body, Natural England, in 2006.

The process for establishing an SSSI is as follows:

 When a site has been identified, Natural England notifies the landowner, the occupier (if different) and the local planning authority (plus relevant government departments and agencies);
 Owners and occupiers are given time to lodge objections or make representations concerning the restrictions imposed on an SSSI;
 The Board of Natural England considers these responses and decides whether to confirm or withdraw the SSSI notification.

The initial notification of a site is accompanied by a citation sheet, which outlines the reasons for the notification: the data in the following list is summarised from these individual citation sheets.

Reasons for notification as SSSI

Of the 88 SSSIs designated in County Durham, 67 have been designated for their biological interest, 16 for their geological interest, and five for both biological and geological interest.

Biological

While many of the SSSIs designated for biological reasons cover a variety of habitats, most have been designated primarily for one (or more) of a small number of reasons, as detailed in the individual citation sheets:

Habitats
 Moorland (upland heath and bogs) – Bollihope, Pikestone, Eggleston and Woodland Fells, Bowes Moor, Cotherstone Moor, Hexhamshire Moors, Lune Forest, Moorhouse and Cross Fell, Muggleswick, Stanhope and Edmundbyers Commons and Blanchland Moor, Upper Teesdale
 Lowland heath – Green Croft and Langley Moor, Hesledon Moor West, Waldridge Fell
 Wetlands (carr, fen, etc) – Burnhope Burn, Butterby Oxbow, Causey Bank Mires, Frog Wood Bog, Hell Kettles, Hesledon Moor East, Hesledon Moor West, Hisehope Burn Valley, Hulam Fen, Middleton Quarry, Pike Whin Bog, Pow Hill Bog, Railway Stell West, Redcar Field, The Carrs, Waldridge Fell, Witton-le-Wear
 Semi-natural woodland – Backstone Bank and Baal Hill Woods, Baldersdale Woodlands, Brignall Banks, Castle Eden Dene, Derwent Gorge and Horsleyhope Ravine, Hawthorn Dene, Hisehope Burn Valley, Hunder Beck Juniper, Shipley and Great Woods, Slit Woods, Westernhope Burn Wood
 Magnesian limestone grassland – Bishop Middleham Quarry, Cassop Vale, Charity Land, Dabble Bank, Durham Coast, Fishburn Grassland, Hawthorn Dene, Hesledon Moor East, Pig Hill, Pittington Hill, Quarrington Hill Grasslands, Raisby Hill Grassland, Sherburn Hill, The Bottoms, Thrislington Plantation, Town Kelloe Bank, Trimdon Limestone Quarry, Tuthill Quarry, Wingate Quarry
 Hay meadows – Bowlees and Friar House Meadows, Cornriggs Meadows, Far High House Meadows, Grains o' th' Beck Meadows, Hannah's Meadows, Low Redford Meadows, Mere Beck Meadows, Middle Crossthwaite, Middle Side and Stonygill Meadows, Newton Ketton Meadow, Rigg Farm and Stake Hill Meadows, West Newlandside Meadows, West Park Meadows
 Open water – Brasside Pond, The Carrs, Witton-le-Wear
 Fauna
 Breeding birds – Bollihope, Pikestone, Eggleston and Woodland Fells, Bowes Moor, Cotherstone Moor, Durham Coast, Hexhamshire Moors, Lune Forest, Moorhouse and Cross Fell, Muggleswick, Stanhope and Edmundbyers Commons and Blanchland Moor, Teesdale Allotments, Upper Teesdale
 Invertebrates – Bishop Middleham Quarry, Cassop Vale, Durham Coast, Green Croft and Langley Moor, Hexhamshire Moors, Middleton Quarry, Moorhouse and Cross Fell, Pig Hill, Quarrington Hill Grasslands, Raisby Hill Grassland, Sherburn Hill, Thrislington Plantation, Town Kelloe Bank, Upper Teesdale, Waldridge Fell

Geological

The surface geology of County Durham is largely confined to rocks dating from the Carboniferous and Permian periods. In the west of the county, outcrops of Dinantian limestones are found in the river valleys, while the upland areas are underlain by the younger Namurian Millstone Grit Series. To the east, these rocks dip beneath the Westphalian Coal Measures, which underlay a broad swathe in the centre of the county. Further east, the Coal Measures are overlain by Permian Magnesian Limestone, which forms a low plateau across the eastern part of the county. Igneous intrusions are a prominent feature of the geology and gave rise to extensive mining for lead and other minerals, especially in the upper Weardale area in the west of the county.

Although each SSSI designated for geological reasons has its own distinctive features, they fall into a small number of broad categories, as indicated in the individual citation sheets:

 Stratigraphy
 Sedimentary – Botany Hill, Crag Gill, Crime Rigg, Durham Coast, Hawthorn Quarry, Raisby Hill Quarry, Rogerley Quarry, Sleightholme Beck Gorge – The Troughs, Stony Cut, Cold Hesledon, Trimdon Limestone Quarry, Yoden Village Quarry
 Igneous – Greenfoot Quarry, Moorhouse and Cross Fell, Upper Teesdale, West Rigg Open Cutting
 Mineralogy – Close House Mine, Foster's Hush, Moorhouse and Cross Fell, Old Moss Lead Vein, Upper Teesdale, West Rigg Open Cutting
 Palaeontology – Middridge Quarry
 Quaternary events – Durham Coast, Upper Teesdale
 Geomorphology
 Cave development – Fairy Holes Cave, God's Bridge, Moorhouse and Cross Fell
 Coastal – Durham Coast
 Periglacial – Moorhouse and Cross Fell
 Fluvial – Moorhouse and Cross Fell

Area covered

From its inception, English Nature classified sites using the 1974–1996 county system. As Natural England uses the same system, it is also adopted in the following list. As a result, some sites that lie within the ceremonial county of Durham and might therefore be expected to be listed here will be found instead in either the Cleveland or the Tyne and Wear lists.

For other counties, see List of SSSIs by Area of Search.

Sites

Notes
 Data rounded to one decimal place.
 Grid reference is based on the British national grid reference system, also known as OSGB36, and is the system used by the Ordnance Survey. Where an SSSI consists of multiple, non-contiguous sections, each section is assigned its own OS grid reference.
 Link to maps using the Nature on the Map service provided by Natural England.
 Natural England also lists Derwent Gorge and Horsleyhope Ravine under Northumberland.
 Natural England also lists Durham Coast under both Cleveland and Tyne and Wear.
 The grid reference for Hexhamshire Moors places it in Northumberland, not Durham; Natural England lists it under both counties.
 Natural England also lists Moorhouse and Cross Fell under Cumbria.
 Natural England also lists Muggleswick, Stanhope and Edmundbyers Commons and Blanchland Moor under Northumberland.

References

External links
 List of SSSIs in County Durham at Natural England

Protected areas of County Durham
 
County Durham
Sites